Daniel Amador Gaxiola (born 4 September 1956) in Elota, Sinaloa is a Mexican politician affiliated with the PRI. He served as Senator of the LXII Legislature of the Mexican Congress representing Sinaloa. He also served as Deputy of the Chamber of Deputies during the LX Legislature from 1 September 2006 to 31 August 2009. He was municipal president of Elota, Sinaloa from 1 January 2002 to 31 December 2004.

References

1956 births
Living people
Politicians from Sinaloa
Institutional Revolutionary Party politicians
Members of the Senate of the Republic (Mexico)
Members of the Chamber of Deputies (Mexico)
20th-century Mexican politicians
21st-century Mexican politicians
Members of the Congress of Sinaloa
Municipal presidents in Sinaloa
Senators of the LXII and LXIII Legislatures of Mexico